Jarut (Serbian Cyrillic: Јарут) is a mountain in southwestern Serbia, surrounding the Pešter plateau, near the town of Tutin. Its highest peak Markov vrh has an elevation of 1,428 meters above sea level.

References

Mountains of Serbia